Kansas's 27th Senate district is one of 40 districts in the Kansas Senate. It has been represented by Republican Gene Suellentrop since 2017, succeeding fellow Republican Leslie Donovan.

Geography
District 27 is based in the western reaches of Wichita in Sedgwick County, also covering some or all of the suburbs of Colwich, Andale, Maize, and Goddard.

The district is located entirely within Kansas's 4th congressional district, and overlaps with the 90th, 91st, 94th, 100th, 101st, and 105th districts of the Kansas House of Representatives.

Recent election results

2020

2016

2012

Federal and statewide results in District 27

References

27
Sedgwick County, Kansas